Vegard Leikvoll Moberg (born 23 January 1991) is a Norwegian professional footballer who plays as a midfielder for Brann .

Club career
Moberg started his career in Os. He made his senior debut for Åsane on 16 July 2011 against Pors Grenland; Åsane lost 3–0. He signed for Tippeligaen side Sogndal in the summer on 2016. Before the 2017 season Moberg signed a three-year contract with Bodø/Glimt. On 10 January 2020 Moberg signed a contract with Danish club Silkeborg. His deal was terminated by mutual consent due to personal issues on 5 October 2020 and Moberg returned to Norway. Moberg went back to Bodø/Glimt, on a deal out the 2020 season.

Career statistics

Club

Honours
Bodø/Glimt
Eliteserien: 2020

References

1991 births
Living people
People from Os, Hordaland
Norwegian footballers
Norwegian expatriate footballers
Åsane Fotball players
Sogndal Fotball players
FK Bodø/Glimt players
Silkeborg IF players
Norwegian First Division players
Eliteserien players
Danish Superliga players
Danish 1st Division players
Association football midfielders
Norwegian expatriate sportspeople in Denmark
Expatriate men's footballers in Denmark
Sportspeople from Vestland